The Caudron C.360 was a French racing aircraft built by Caudron in the early 1930s to compete in Coupe Deutsch de la Meurthe air races.

Design
The C.360 was a low-wing monoplane racer design to be powered by one  Régnier 6 engine, but lack of availability required the use of  Renault 4Pei Bengali engines in two of the three aircraft, which were re-designated C.362. The third C.360 airframe was completed with a  Régnier 6 engine and was re-designated C.366 Martinet.

Variants
C.360 Original design for a racing aircraft powered by a  Régnier 6 engine; Three built, completed as C.362 and C.366 racers.
C.362 Two of the C.360 airframes powered by  Renault 4Pei Bengali engines.
C.366 Martinet The third C.360 airframe completed with a  Régnier 6 engine and flush cockpit, the pilot sitting on an adjustable seat behind an extending windshield.

Specifications (C.366 Martinet)

References

1930s French sport aircraft
C.360
Single-engined tractor aircraft
Racing aircraft
Aircraft first flown in 1933